Homalopoma umbilicatum is a species of minute deepwater sea snail with a calcareous operculum, a marine gastropod mollusc in the family Colloniidae.

Distribution 
This species occurs in New Zealand.

References

 Kantor Yu.I. & Sysoev A.V. (2006) Marine and brackish water Gastropoda of Russia and adjacent countries: an illustrated catalogue. Moscow: KMK Scientific Press. 372 pp. + 140 pls. page(s): 42
 Gulbin V.V. & Chaban E.M. (2012) Annotated list of shell-bearing gastropods of Commander Islands. Part I. The Bulletin of the Russian Far East Malacological Society 15-16: 5–30

Colloniidae
Gastropods described in 1926